Matt Borgschulte is an American professional baseball coach for the Baltimore Orioles of Major League Baseball.

Borgschulte attended Parkway Central High School in Chesterfield, Missouri. He attended Western Kentucky University and Drury University, where he played college baseball for the Western Kentucky Hilltoppers and the Drury Panthers.

Borgschulte was the hitting coach for Southeast Missouri State University in 2015 and 2016. He joined the Minnesota Twins organization in 2018 as the hitting coach for the Gulf Coast League Twins. In 2019, he was hitting coach for the Fort Myers Miracle, and he was promoted to be the hitting coach for the Rochester Red Wings in the 2020 season.

In 2021, Borgschulte was the hitting coach for the St. Paul Saints. After the 2021 season, the Baltimore Orioles hired Borgschulte and Ryan Fuller as co-hitting coaches.

References

External links

Living people
Baltimore Orioles coaches
Major League Baseball hitting coaches
Western Kentucky Hilltoppers baseball players
Drury Panthers baseball players
People from Chesterfield, Missouri
Year of birth missing (living people)
Baseball players from Missouri
Baseball coaches from Missouri
Southeast Missouri State Redhawks baseball coaches
Rochester Red Wings coaches